Phạm Như Phương (born 25 November 2003) is a Vietnamese artistic gymnast.  She represented Vietnam at the 2018 Youth Olympics where she was part of the gold medal winning mixed multi-discipline team.

Early life 
Như Phương was born in Hanoi in 2003.

Gymnastics career

2017–18
Như Phương competed at the 2017 Olympic Hopes Cup where she placed 34th in the all-around.

At the 2018 Junior Asian Championships Như Phương finished ninth in the all-around.  She was selected to represent Vietnam at the 2018 Summer Youth Olympics.  While there she was named to the mixed multi-discipline team named after American gymnast Simone Biles; the team placed first.  Như Phương did not qualify for any individual event finals but was the fourth reserve for the all-around.

2019
Như Phương turned senior in 2019 and made her senior international debut at the Korea Cup where she finished seventh on balance beam and ninth on floor exercise.

2022
Như Phương competed at the postponed Southeast Asian Games.  She helped Vietnam place second as a team and individually she won silver on uneven bars and bronze on balance beam and floor exercise.

Competitive history

References

External links 
 

Living people
2003 births
Sportspeople from Hanoi
Vietnamese female artistic gymnasts
Southeast Asian Games silver medalists for Vietnam
Gymnasts at the 2018 Summer Youth Olympics
Youth Olympic gold medalists for Vietnam
Southeast Asian Games bronze medalists for Vietnam
Competitors at the 2021 Southeast Asian Games
21st-century Vietnamese women
Southeast Asian Games medalists in gymnastics